'What You Do To Me' may refer to:
 "What You Do to Me", 1991 song by Teenage Fanclub from their album Bandwagonesque 
 "What You Do to Me", 2016 song by John Legend from their album Darkness and Light 
 the 1980 track What Cha Doin by Seawind (band)
 Hot Diggity (Dog Ziggity Boom), recorded by Perry Como in 1956, because it repeatedly features the words "what you do to me"